Thanun Pyriadi is an Kurdish chemist.

Education
Pyriadi was born in 1933 in the small village of Ali Mansour near Chamchamal in Iraqi Kurdistan. He was the first graduate in his class since the first year of primary school, secondary school and college to receive a B.Sc. (Honors) in chemistry. He received the Prime Minister's prize for ranking first in his class.

Career
In 1952 he was trained in Secreen in the north of Iraq as part of his military service. He was the first graduate, and was awarded a prize.
 In 1967 he obtained his M.Sc. degree in biochemistry from Oklahoma State University–Stillwater, in Stillwater, Oklahoma, in the USA.
 He received his Ph.D. degree in organic chemistry and polymer chemistry in 1970 from the University of Akron, Ohio USA .
 He returned to Baghdad, Iraq when he was offered a position in the Department of Chemistry at the University of Baghdad. He was promoted to professor in 1988.
 He was the first to bring polymer chemistry and chemical literature as new subjects to be taught in Iraqi universities. He has also written textbooks and laboratory manuals in both subjects.
 He worked at the University of Sulaimania between 1972 and 1975.
 In 1975 he did a post-doctorate at the University of Arizona, in Tucson, AZ, United States, with professor H. K. Hall, Jr., in the field of organic polymers.
 In 1982 he worked at the University of Michigan, Ann Arbor in the US Department of Chemistry. He was a visiting professor, performing a post doctorate with the late professor C. G. Overberger.
 He was the first Iraqi professor to participate in writing the recent polymeric material Encyclopedia J.Salamon ed 13 volume CRC press, vol3 and 8, 1996 .
 He was selected as "First Professor Of The Year" in 1996-1997 .
 His name is listed in "Who's Who in Iraq in the 20th Century", vol 1, page 72, 1990.

Selected publications
Preparation of new copolymers of vinyl acetate and N-substituted maleimides, Polymer journal, Volume 37, Issue 23, November 1996, Pages 5283-5287
Synthesis and free radical polymerization of N-substituted citraconimides, Journal of Polymer Science Part A: Polymer Chemistry, Volume 18, Issue 8, pages 2535–2541, August 1980
Synthesis, polymerization, and curing of N-substituted citraconimidyl acrylate, Journal of Polymer Science Part A: Polymer Chemistry, Volume 37, Issue 4, pages 427–433, 15 February 1999
Anionic ring-opening polymerization of several N-substituted diphenimides, Journal of Polymer Science Part A: Polymer Chemistry, Volume 31, Issue 13, pages 3199–3203, December 1993

Additional contributions by professor Thanun Pyriadi since 2006 up till now
1/ BOOKS

   * " food and health " in Kurdish language Irbil, Araze publisher, 2006, 250 pages.
   * " biography of professor Thanun Pyriadi " Kakouk, Iraq  ( Aricha publisher ) 240 pages, in Kurdish and Arabic languages, 2006.
   * " Chamchamal in the forties and fifties of 20th century " 139 pages, Karkouk ( Ruj publisher ) 2011.
   * " Essentials of polymer science and their applications " by Thanun Pyriadi and Asaad Karadagi, 450 pages, printed in Sulaimania
       text book, 2013, Kurdish language.
   * " University of Sulaimanya at KalaDeza " and memories of participation in Kurd revolution 1974, Kurdish language, ( academy of
       Kurdistan publication ) 100 pages, 2013.
2/ ARTICLES
    Between 2006 and 2014, he has published more than 300 articles in local journals, their topics mostly scientific.
    One of the articles is about ( plastic problems ) published in the journal of ( Kurdish Academy ) in Irbil, 2012, 20 pages.

3/ AWARDS AND PRIZES 
 
   * On June 15, 2006 he received the ( prize of chemistry and physics ) from the society of chemistry and physics in Karkouk.
   * He received a prize in the anniversary celebration of ( Kurdistan teacher ) in June, 2006 in Kakouk.
   * On June 18, 2012 he received the ( Galawez award ) for excellence by Roshenbery center in Kakouk.
   * Research papers, Tahanun Pyriadi, M. refaat and sadik.

References

1933 births
Living people
Iraqi Kurdish people
Iraqi scientists
Oklahoma State University alumni
University of Akron alumni
University of Michigan fellows